Muskowekwan 85-24 is an Indian reserve of the Muskowekwan First Nation in Saskatchewan. It is 56 kilometres north of Fort Qu'Appelle. In the 2016 Canadian Census, it recorded a population of 0 living in 0 of its 0 total private dwellings.

References

Indian reserves in Saskatchewan
Division No. 10, Saskatchewan